{{DISPLAYTITLE:C16H19N3O5S}}
The molecular formula C16H19N3O5S (molar mass: 365.4 g/mol) may refer to:

 Amoxicillin
 Cefroxadine
 Heparinoid

Molecular formulas